Walter Bianchi (born 7 November 1963) is an Italian former professional footballer who played as a defender, usually as a left-back, although he was also capable of playing on the right.

Playing career
Bianchi made his Serie A debut with AC Milan on 13 September 1987, in a 3–1 away win over Pisa. He spent two seasons with the club, who were being coached by Arrigo Sacchi at the time, playing five games in Serie A; he won the 1987–88 Serie A title with the club and the 1988–89 European Cup.

His career was hampered by injuries; he had to undergo ten surgeries in twelve years overall.

On 28 July 1992, he was hurt in a traffic accident involving the team bus of Hellas Verona F.C. and fell into a coma for several days. He recovered in a few months.

Honours
AC Milan
 Serie A champion: 1987–88.
 Supercoppa Italiana winner: 1988.
 European Cup winner: 1988–89.

References

1963 births
Living people
Italian footballers
Serie A players
Serie B players
Rimini F.C. 1912 players
Brescia Calcio players
Parma Calcio 1913 players
A.C. Milan players
Torino F.C. players
Cosenza Calcio 1914 players
Hellas Verona F.C. players
Association football defenders
People from Aarau